The Elwood Building was built in 1879 for a Rochester lawyer Frank W. Elwood, whose family owned the property. The Elwood Building was the first building to have a mail chute, which was installed in 1884 by James Goold Cutler, the inventor of the mail chute.

References

  - Demolished in 1967.

Office buildings in Rochester, New York

Buildings and structures completed in 1879
Buildings and structures demolished in 1967
Demolished buildings and structures in New York (state)